The 1961 Women's Western Open was contested from June 1–4 at Belle Meade Country Club in Nashville, Tennessee. It was the 32nd edition of the Women's Western Open.

This event was won by Mary Lena Faulk.

Final leaderboard

References

External links
The Spokesman Review source
Evening Independent

Women's Western Open
Golf in Tennessee
Sports competitions in Nashville, Tennessee
Women's Western Open
Women's Western Open
Women's Western Open
Women's sports in Tennessee